Diego Moreno may refer to:

 Diego Moreno (baseball) (born 1987), Venezuelan baseball player
 Diego Moreno (footballer, born 1996), Colombian football midfielder
 Diego Moreno (footballer, born 2001), Spanish football defender

See also
 Guito (born 1989), born Diego Moreno Escobar, Spanish football wingback